Men with Guns is a 1997 Canadian crime drama film, directed by Kari Skogland. The film stars Donal Logue and Gregory Sporleder as Goldman and Lucas, two smalltime hustlers who run afoul of local mob boss Horace Burke (Paul Sorvino) when they discover and steal a stash of cocaine.

The cast also includes Callum Keith Rennie, Max Perlich, Joseph Griffin, Bill MacDonald, Janet Kidder, Sabrina Grdevich, Jack Duffy, Mimi Kuzyk, Joe Pingue and Tony Nappo.

The film premiered in the Perspective Canada program at the 1997 Toronto International Film Festival. The film faced some press criticism for its title, as American filmmaker John Sayles had also screened a film titled Men with Guns at TIFF just four days earlier.

References

External links
 

1997 films
1997 drama films
Canadian crime drama films
English-language Canadian films
Films directed by Kari Skogland
1990s English-language films
1990s Canadian films